Harry Evan James (20 November 1865 – 13 March 1951) was a British fencer. He competed at the 1908 and 1920 Summer Olympics. His son Jack was also an accomplished fencer who competed in the 1928 Summer Olympics. In 1901, he won the men's foil title at the British Fencing Championships.

References

1865 births
1951 deaths
British male fencers
Olympic fencers of Great Britain
Fencers at the 1908 Summer Olympics
Fencers at the 1920 Summer Olympics
20th-century British people